Stars in Their Eyes is a British television talent series, based on Joop van den Ende's Dutch format Soundmixshow. It featured a singing contest in which members of the public impersonate showbiz stars.

The show premiered on 21 July 1990 and initially ran until 23 December 2006. It was produced by Granada for ITV and originally presented by Leslie Crowther. Matthew Kelly took over in May 1993, before he was replaced by Cat Deeley in April 2004. An Elvis Presley special hosted by Russ Abbot aired in January 1993, as well as 2003 specials hosted by Davina McCall. A number of celebrity specials and a children's spin-off series were also aired during the original run.

A six-part revival hosted by Harry Hill aired from 10 January 2015 to 14 February 2015, but it was later axed by ITV due to low ratings and poor reviews. In 2022, the format was revived as Starstruck.

History
A series of non-televised pilots were filmed in 1989 hosted by Chris Tarrant. However, in February 1990, Leslie Crowther was chosen as the host of the show which began airing on 21 July 1990. Crowther hosted the first three series, and a Christmas Special in 1991. At the time of his car accident in October 1992, he was booked to record an Elvis Presley special (which was later hosted by Russ Abbot) and a fourth series (later hosted by Matthew Kelly) in 1993.

It then became clear that Crowther would not be able to return. He announced his retirement from showbusiness in November 1994 and died 2 years later. Therefore, Kelly hosted the show until the live grand final of the 15th series on 13 March 2004. Kelly announced a few days earlier that he would quit the show in order to pursue his acting career full-time. Kelly also hosted the 2001 pilot episode, and first series of the kids version in 2002.

In January 2003, Kelly was arrested by police over allegations of child sex abuse resulting in Davina McCall temporarily guest hosting the show for three celebrity specials that were broadcast the following month. Kelly returned after the charges were dropped.

Cat Deeley, who previously took over as host of the kids' version in 2003, was Kelly's replacement for the final adult series in 2005. Deeley also hosted several celebrity specials in 2004. In June 2006, ITV denied reports that the series was facing the axe although admitted that the future of the show was being discussed. Deeley hosted the show until its final episode in December 2006; the show was then axed by ITV.

The most impersonated stars are Dolly Parton, Elvis Presley, Cher, George Michael, Celine Dion, Kylie Minogue and Madonna.

2015 revival
Harry Hill took over as host on 10 January 2015, with all episodes pre-recorded and the winner of each show again voted for by the studio audience.

The revival proved divisive – fans of the original format were critical of it, saying that Harry Hill had made the show about him rather than the contestants; while others acknowledged that the revival was a post-modern parody of the original, with its knowing ridicule of talent show cliches such as terrible performances being overpraised, and the actions of the presenter receiving high editorial focus to distract from the outdated performance element being thinly stretched. Each episode features Harry being pursued by Adele (really a look-alike) for being in possession of her baby and she would comically chase him until she got the baby back.

In April 2015, it was announced that due to poor viewing figures, ITV would not be renewing the show for another series, and it was axed.

2022 return as Starstruck

Format
Stars in Their Eyes is a talent show where contestants get the chance to appear and sing live as a famous singer. The show is most importantly a 'soundalike' show, but they are also dressed up to look as close as possible to the singer they are impersonating, often with wigs and heavy makeup. Each contestant would walk through 'smoky' doors before instantly reappearing dressed up as their chosen star.

Heats
The contestants appear firstly as themselves, talking briefly to the host about their lives and giving clues as to who they are going to be performing as, finishing with the now famous catchphrase 'Tonight [presenter name] I'm going to be...' The contestants then disappear through the equally famous doors and reappear as the famous singer they are going to impersonate, seemingly instantly.

At the end of the show, the studio audience vote for their favourite, and the winner is announced. The winners from each show in the series return for the grand final to perform once more.

Grand Final & Live Grand Final

1990–1992, 2015
In the original Leslie Crowther version and 2015 revival, the grand finals were pre-recorded, and the winner of the whole series was voted for by the studio audience at the end of the show. The first series final in 1990 also had a celebrity panel, consisting of Joe Longthorne, Sally Dynevor and Pete Waterman, who gave their opinions after each performance.

1993–2006
When Matthew Kelly took over, the grand finals were broadcast live, and the winner of the whole series was voted for by the viewing public through the phone lines and in later years online as well. The winner was announced later that same evening in a separate broadcast.

The same process applied during Cat Deeley's tenure as host.

Episode guide

Champions

Regular series
Series 1 (1990) – Maxine Barrie as Shirley Bassey
Series 2 (1991) – Bernard Wenton as Nat "King" Cole
Series 3 (1992) – Amanda Normansell as Patsy Cline
Series 4 (1993) – Jacquii Cann as Alison Moyet
Series 5 (1994) – John Finch as Marti Pellow
Series 6 (1995) – Lee Griffiths as Bobby Darin
Series 7 (1996) – Paul Doody as Marti Pellow
Series 8 (1997) – Faye Dempsey as Olivia Newton-John
Series 9 (1998) – Jason Searle as Neil Diamond
Series 10 (1999) – Ian Moor as Chris De Burgh (also won Champion of Champions)
Series 11 (Spring 2000) – Gary Mullen as Freddie Mercury
Series 12 (Winter 2000) – Nicola Kirsch as Maria Callas
Series 13 (2001) – Emma Wilkinson as Dusty Springfield
Series 14 (2002) – Stewart Duff as Elvis Presley
Series 15 (2004) – Charles Ngandwe as Paul Robeson
Series 16 (2005) – Gordon Hendricks as Elvis Presley
Series 17 (2015) – Peter Sarsfield as Frankie Valli

Junior series
Series 1 (2002) – Charlotte Gethin as Eva Cassidy
Series 2 (2003) – Laura Jenkins as Connie Francis
Series 3 (2004) – Paul Cowperthwaite as Michael Jackson
Series 4 (2006) – Christopher Napier as George Formby

Transmissions

Main series

Stars in Their Eyes: Kids

Specials
A number of different specials were aired during the course of the show's original run, the majority of which featured celebrities as the contestants.

Non-celebrity

Celebrity

Reception

Ratings and awards
It is still one of Britain's most successful shows of all time, attracting around 13 million viewers for the live grand final at the end of each series. It has one of the most memorable catchphrases in TV history: 'Tonight Matthew, I'm going to be...’ and was named Most Popular Entertainment Programme at the National Television Awards in 1996, 1998, 1999 and 2000. The show was nominated for the same award again in 1997, 2001 and 2002 but lost out to other ITV shows (An Evening With Lily Savage in 1997, My Kind of Music in 2001 and Pop Idol in 2002).

See also
 Soundmixshow
 European Soundmix Show
 Stars in Euro Eyes 2001
 Stars in Their Eyes European Championships 2002

References

External links

Stars in Their Eyes at BFI
Stars in Their Eyes Kids at BFI

1990s British television series
2000s British television series
2010s British television series
1990 British television series debuts
2015 British television series endings
British music television shows
English-language television shows
European Soundmix Show
ITV reality television shows
Singing talent shows
Television series by Endemol
Television series by ITV Studios
Television shows set in Manchester
British television series revived after cancellation
Television shows produced by Granada Television
British television series based on Dutch television series
Cultural depictions of Freddie Mercury
Cultural depictions of Elvis Presley
Cultural depictions of Michael Jackson
Cultural depictions of Maria Callas